Teuscheria is a genus of orchids native to southern Mexico, Central America and northern South America.  The genus is named for Henry Teuscher, an award-winning landscape artist and horticulturalist.

Species accepted as of June 2014:

Teuscheria archilae  Guatemala
Teuscheria cornucopia  - Ecuador
Teuscheria desireei  - Guatemala
Teuscheria dodsonii  - Ecuador
Teuscheria elegans  - Colombia
Teuscheria guatemalensis  - GuatemalaTeuscheria horichiana  - Costa RicaTeuscheria integrilabia  - EcuadorTeuscheria pickiana  - Mexico (Oaxaca, Chiapas) to EcuadorTeuscheria wageneri  - Costa Rica to W. Colombia, Venezuela to NE. Ecuador

Of these species, three were described from Guatemala in 2013. These are T. archilae, T. desireei and T. guatemalensis. According to the protologue, T. archilae and T. guatemalensis occur in the wild in Guatemala, while the type and the description of T. desireei'' were based on material cultivated in Guatemala but probably native to Venezuela.

References

Maxillariinae genera
Maxillariinae